St. George's-Humber is a provincial electoral district in Newfoundland and Labrador, which is represented by one member in the Newfoundland and Labrador House of Assembly. It was contested for the first time in the 2015 provincial election.

The district consists of the communities in Humber Valley from Steady Brook to Pynn's Brook as well as the Corner Brook suburb of Massey Drive. It also includes the communities on the south side of St. George's Bay and the communities along the Codroy River.

Members of the House of Assembly
The district has elected the following Members of the House of Assembly:

Election results

References

Newfoundland and Labrador provincial electoral districts